In mathematics, more specifically differential algebra, a p-derivation (for p a prime number) on a ring R, is a mapping from R to R that satisfies certain conditions outlined directly below. The notion of a p-derivation is related to that of a derivation in differential algebra.

Definition
Let p be a prime number. A p-derivation or Buium derivative on a ring  is a map  that satisfies the following "product rule":

and "sum rule":

,

as well as 

.

Note that in the "sum rule" we are not really dividing by p, since all the relevant binomial coefficients in the numerator are divisible by p, so this definition applies in the case when  has p-torsion.

Relation to Frobenius Endomorphisms
A map  is a lift of the Frobenius endomorphism provided . An example of such a lift could come from the Artin map.

If  is a ring with a p-derivation, then the map  defines a ring endomorphism which is a lift of the Frobenius endomorphism. When the ring R is  free the correspondence is a bijection.

Examples
 For  the unique p-derivation is the map

The quotient is well-defined because of Fermat's little theorem.

defines a p-derivation.

See also
Witt vector
Arithmetic derivative
Derivation
Fermat quotient

References
 .

External links
Project Euclid 

Differential algebra
Generalizations of the derivative